Sir John Hoskyns, 2nd Baronet FRS (23 July 1634 – 12 September 1705) was an English baronet.

He was one of the founders of the Royal Society and served as its president from 1682 to 1683. Between 1685 and 1687 he also represented Herefordshire in the House of Commons.

Life
He was the eldest son of Sir Bennet Hoskyns, 1st Baronet, of Harewood and Morehampton Park, Herefordshire, and grandson of Serjeant John Hoskins, born in Herefordshire on 23 July 1634.  He was educated in the rudiments of Latin by his mother, Anne, daughter of Sir John Bingley of Temple Combe, Somerset, and was later sent to Westminster School under Richard Busby.

Sir John married Jane, eldest daughter of Sir Gabriel Lowe of Newark, Gloucestershire by Ann Hungerford of South Marston.  They lived at Harewood End, as did Jane continue in widowhood until 1724 when she died, and was buried in the church there.  They left a large family.  Of these Sir Bennet Hoskyns succeeded as 3rd baronet.  His brother Sir Hungerford was the 4th baronet married to Mary, daughter of the Lord Chandos.  Younger brother John was MA and Rector of Peterstow.

Hoskyns was called to the bar at the Middle Temple, and although he may have practised, acquired a reputation as a lawyer, and was made a master in chancery bench.  In 1680 he succeeded his father in the baronetcy (having been knighted previously), and five years later was chosen Member of Parliament for Herefordshire; but was not active in politics.

Hoskyns was elected President of the Royal Society in 1682, in succession to his friend Sir Christopher Wren. His friends included Francis North, 1st Baron Guilford, John Evelyn, and John Aubrey.  Sir John was elected to parliament called on the death of Charles II for Herefordshire.  He resigned the chair the following year, but from 1685 to 1687 was secretary. He died on 12 September 1705, and was buried at Harewood, Herefordshire.

Family
Hoskyns married Jane, daughter of Sir Gabriel Low, and his two sons, Bennet and Hungerford (d. 1766), were third and fourth baronets successively.

Notes

See also
 List of presidents of the Royal Society

References

Further reading

Kidd, Charles, Williamson, David (editors). Debrett's Peerage and Baronetage (1990 edition). New York: St Martin's Press, 1990.

External links

1634 births
1705 deaths
Baronets in the Baronetage of England
English MPs 1685–1687
Presidents of the Royal Society
Original Fellows of the Royal Society